The 1984–85 NBA season was the Bullets 24th season in the NBA and their 12th season in the city of Washington, D.C.

Draft picks

Roster

Regular season

Season standings

Notes
 z, y – division champions
 x – clinched playoff spot

Record vs. opponents

Game log

Regular season

|- align="center" bgcolor="#ffcccc"
| 1
| October 26, 1984
| @ Chicago
| L 93–109
|
|
|
| Chicago Stadium
| 0–1
|- align="center" bgcolor="#ccffcc"
| 2
| October 27, 1984
| @ Indiana
| W 104–102
|
|
|
| Market Square Arena
| 1–1
|- align="center" bgcolor="#ccffcc"
| 3
| October 30, 1984
| Atlanta
| W 119–104
|
|
|
| Capital Centre
| 2–1
|- align="center" bgcolor="#ffcccc"
| 4
| October 31, 1984
| @ Milwaukee
| L 79–105
|
|
|
| MECCA Arena
| 2–2

|- align="center" bgcolor="#ffcccc"
| 5
| November 2, 1984
| Milwaukee
| L 96–102
|
|
|
| Capital Centre
| 2–3
|- align="center" bgcolor="#ffcccc"
| 6
| November 3, 1984
| @ Atlanta
| L 107–127
|
|
|
| The Omni
| 2–4
|- align="center" bgcolor="#ffcccc"
| 7
| November 7, 1984
| @ New Jersey
| L 88–99
|
|
|
| Brendan Byrne Arena
| 2–5
|- align="center" bgcolor="#ccffcc"
| 8
| November 8, 1984
| L.A. Clippers
| W 93–88
|
|
|
| Capital Centre
| 3–5
|- align="center" bgcolor="#ccffcc"
| 9
| November 10, 1984
| Boston
| W 112–95
|
|
|
| Capital Centre
| 4–5
|- align="center" bgcolor="#ccffcc"
| 10
| November 13, 1984
| @ New York
| W 103–92
|
|
|
| Madison Square Garden
| 5–5
|- align="center" bgcolor="#ccffcc"
| 11
| November 14, 1984
| San Antonio
| W 125–106
|
|
|
| Capital Centre
| 6–5
|- align="center" bgcolor="#ccffcc"
| 12
| November 16, 1984
| New York
| W 118–104
|
|
|
| Capital Centre
| 7–5
|- align="center" bgcolor="#ccffcc"
| 13
| November 20, 1984
| @ Philadelphia
| W 120–105
|
|
|
| The Spectrum
| 8–5
|- align="center" bgcolor="#ccffcc"
| 14
| November 21, 1984
| Kansas City
| W 97–92
|
|
|
| Capital Centre
| 9–5
|- align="center" bgcolor="#ffcccc"
| 15
| November 23, 1984
| @ Boston
| L 110–118
|
|
|
| Boston Garden
| 9–6
|- align="center" bgcolor="#ccffcc"
| 16
| November 24, 1984
| Detroit
| W 112–106
|
|
|
| Capital Centre
| 10–6
|- align="center" bgcolor="#ffcccc"
| 17
| November 27, 1984
| Philadelphia
| L 89–93
|
|
|
| Capital Centre
| 10–7
|- align="center" bgcolor="#ccffcc"
| 18
| November 30, 1984
| @ Detroit
| W 114–106
|
|
|
| Pontiac Silverdome
| 11–7

|- align="center" bgcolor="#ccffcc"
| 19
| December 1, 1984
| Milwaukee
| W 100–97
|
|
|
| Capital Centre
| 12–7
|- align="center" bgcolor="#ccffcc"
| 20
| December 6, 1984
| Indiana
| W 111–106
|
|
|
| Capital Centre
| 13–7
|- align="center" bgcolor="#ccffcc"
| 21
| December 8, 19847:30p.m. EST
| L.A. Lakers
| W 101–98
| Robinson (25)
| Ruland (12)
| Ruland (9)
| Capital Centre19,105
| 14–7
|- align="center" bgcolor="#ffcccc"
| 22
| December 11, 1984
| Utah
| L 82–85
|
|
|
| Capital Centre
| 14–8
|- align="center" bgcolor="#ffcccc"
| 23
| December 13, 1984
| @ Phoenix
| L 86–116
|
|
|
| Arizona Veterans Memorial Coliseum
| 14–9
|- align="center" bgcolor="#ffcccc"
| 24
| December 15, 1984
| @ L.A. Clippers
| L 103–109
|
|
|
| Los Angeles Memorial Sports Arena
| 14–10
|- align="center" bgcolor="#ffcccc"
| 25
| December 16, 198410:30p.m. EST
| @ L.A. Lakers
| L 101–109
| Ruland (24)
| Ruland (10)
| Williams (6)
| The Forum15,070
| 14–11
|- align="center" bgcolor="#ccffcc"
| 26
| December 18, 1984
| New Jersey
| W 104–95
|
|
|
| Capital Centre
| 15–11
|- align="center" bgcolor="#ffcccc"
| 27
| December 19, 1984
| @ New Jersey
| L 106–115
|
|
|
| Brendan Byrne Arena
| 15–12
|- align="center" bgcolor="#ccffcc"
| 28
| December 21, 1984
| New York
| W 125–111
|
|
|
| Capital Centre
| 16–12
|- align="center" bgcolor="#ffcccc"
| 29
| December 22, 1984
| @ Atlanta
| L 101–119
|
|
|
| The Omni
| 16–13
|- align="center" bgcolor="#ccffcc"
| 30
| December 26, 1984
| Indiana
| W 114–89
|
|
|
| Capital Centre
| 17–13
|- align="center" bgcolor="#ccffcc"
| 31
| December 28, 1984
| Atlanta
| W 125–111
|
|
|
| Capital Centre
| 18–13
|- align="center" bgcolor="#ccffcc"
| 32
| December 29, 1984
| @ New York
| W 116–108
|
|
|
| Madison Square Garden
| 19–13

|- align="center" bgcolor="#ffcccc"
| 33
| January 3, 1985
| @ Cleveland
| L 93–100
|
|
|
| Richfield Coliseum
| 19–14
|- align="center" bgcolor="#ffcccc"
| 34
| January 5, 1985
| Detroit
| L 113–121
|
|
|
| Capital Centre
| 19–15
|- align="center" bgcolor="#ccffcc"
| 35
| January 8, 1985
| @ Milwaukee
| W 99–95
|
|
|
| MECCA Arena
| 20–15
|- align="center" bgcolor="#ffcccc"
| 36
| January 11, 1985
| @ Boston
| L 101–103
|
|
|
| Boston Garden
| 20–16
|- align="center" bgcolor="#ffcccc"
| 37
| January 13, 1985
| Philadelphia
| L 104–115
|
|
|
| Capital Centre
| 20–17
|- align="center" bgcolor="#ccffcc"
| 38
| January 14, 1985
| @ Cleveland
| W 101–91
|
|
|
| Richfield Coliseum
| 21–17
|- align="center" bgcolor="#ccffcc"
| 39
| January 16, 1985
| @ Utah
| W 103–101
|
|
|
| Salt Palace Acord Arena
| 22–17
|- align="center" bgcolor="#ffcccc"
| 40
| January 18, 1985
| @ Denver
| L 106–108
|
|
|
| McNichols Sports Arena
| 22–18
|- align="center" bgcolor="#ffcccc"
| 41
| January 19, 1985
| @ Kansas City
| L 98–103
|
|
|
| Kemper Arena
| 22–19
|- align="center" bgcolor="#ccffcc"
| 42
| January 21, 1985
| Cleveland
| W 128–115
|
|
|
| Capital Centre
| 23–19
|- align="center" bgcolor="#ccffcc"
| 43
| January 22, 1985
| Golden State
| W 109–104
|
|
|
| Capital Centre
| 24–19
|- align="center" bgcolor="#ccffcc"
| 44
| January 24, 1985
| Dallas
| W 93–92
|
|
|
| Capital Centre
| 25–19
|- align="center" bgcolor="#ccffcc"
| 45
| January 26, 1985
| Phoenix
| W 110–105 (OT)
|
|
|
| Capital Centre
| 26–19
|- align="center" bgcolor="#ffcccc"
| 46
| January 27, 1985
| @ Detroit
| L 105–115
|
|
|
| Pontiac Silverdome
| 26–20
|- align="center" bgcolor="#ccffcc"
| 47
| January 30, 1985
| Chicago
| W 106–95
|
|
|
| Capital Centre
| 27–20

|- align="center" bgcolor="#ffcccc"
| 48
| February 1, 1985
| @ Indiana
| L 95–102
|
|
|
| Market Square Arena
| 27–21
|- align="center" bgcolor="#ffcccc"
| 49
| February 2, 1985
| Boston
| L 91–97
|
|
|
| Capital Centre
| 27–22
|- align="center" bgcolor="#ffcccc"
| 50
| February 4, 1985
| Cleveland
| L 112–121
|
|
|
| Capital Centre
| 27–23
|- align="center" bgcolor="#ffcccc"
| 51
| February 6, 1985
| @ Philadelphia
| L 111–116
|
|
|
| The Spectrum
| 27–24
|- align="center" bgcolor="#ccffcc"
| 52
| February 7, 1985
| Detroit
| W 128–126 (2OT)
|
|
|
| Capital Centre
| 28–24
|- align="center"
|colspan="9" bgcolor="#bbcaff"|All-Star Break
|- style="background:#cfc;"
|- bgcolor="#bbffbb"
|- align="center" bgcolor="#ffcccc"
| 53
| February 12, 1985
| @ Seattle
| L 94–109
|
|
|
| Kingdome
| 28–25
|- align="center" bgcolor="#ffcccc"
| 54
| February 15, 1985
| @ Portland
| L 89–93
|
|
|
| Memorial Coliseum
| 28–26
|- align="center" bgcolor="#ffcccc"
| 55
| February 17, 1985
| @ Golden State
| L 121–125 (OT)
|
|
|
| Oakland-Alameda County Coliseum Arena
| 28–27
|- align="center" bgcolor="#ccffcc"
| 56
| February 20, 1985
| @ San Antonio
| W 105–104
|
|
|
| HemisFair Arena
| 29–27
|- align="center" bgcolor="#ffcccc"
| 57
| February 22, 1985
| @ Dallas
| L 101–110
|
|
|
| Capital Centre
| 29–28
|- align="center" bgcolor="#ccffcc"
| 58
| February 23, 1985
| @ Houston
| W 123–115
|
|
|
| The Summit
| 30–28
|- align="center" bgcolor="#ffcccc"
| 59
| February 27, 1985
| Denver
| L 111–124
|
|
|
| Capital Centre
| 30–29

|- align="center" bgcolor="#ffcccc"
| 60
| March 1, 1985
| New Jersey
| L 98–100
|
|
|
| Capital Centre
| 30–30
|- align="center" bgcolor="#ccffcc"
| 61
| March 2, 1985
| @ New York
| W 109–97
|
|
|
| Madison Square Garden
| 31–30
|- align="center" bgcolor="#ffcccc"
| 62
| March 5, 1985
| @ Chicago
| L 99–104
|
|
|
| Chicago Stadium
| 31–31
|- align="center" bgcolor="#ccffcc"
| 63
| March 6, 1985
| Portland
| W 127–121 (2OT)
|
|
|
| Capital Centre
| 32–31
|- align="center" bgcolor="#ffcccc"
| 64
| March 9, 1985
| Seattle
| L 92–93
|
|
|
| Capital Centre
| 32–32
|- align="center" bgcolor="#ccffcc"
| 65
| March 11, 1985
| Chicago
| W 119–112
|
|
|
| Capital Centre
| 33–32
|- align="center" bgcolor="#ffcccc"
| 66
| March 13, 1985
| @ New Jersey
| L 109–114
|
|
|
| Brendan Byrne Arena
| 33–33
|- align="center" bgcolor="#ccffcc"
| 67
| March 15, 1985
| Houston
| W 120–114
|
|
|
| Capital Centre
| 34–33
|- align="center" bgcolor="#ffcccc"
| 68
| March 19, 1985
| @ Atlanta
| L 97–103
|
|
|
| Lakefront Arena
| 34–34
|- align="center" bgcolor="#ccffcc"
| 69
| March 20, 1985
| New York
| W 105–102
|
|
|
| Capital Centre
| 35–34
|- align="center" bgcolor="#ffcccc"
| 70
| March 23, 1985
| Boston
| L 98–104
|
|
|
| Capital Centre
| 35–35
|- align="center" bgcolor="#ffcccc"
| 71
| March 26, 1985
| Milwaukee
| L 96–107
|
|
|
| Capital Centre
| 35–36
|- align="center" bgcolor="#ffcccc"
| 72
| March 27, 1985
| @ Philadelphia
| L 97–115
|
|
|
| The Spectrum
| 35–37
|- align="center" bgcolor="#ccffcc"
| 73
| March 29, 1985
| New Jersey
| W 122–98
|
|
|
| Capital Centre
| 36–37
|- align="center" bgcolor="#ccffcc"
| 74
| March 31, 1985
| @ Indiana
| W 111–105
|
|
|
| Market Square Arena
| 37–37

|- align="center" bgcolor="#ffcccc"
| 75
| April 2, 1985
| @ Cleveland
| L 107–122
|
|
|
| Richfield Coliseum
| 37–38
|- align="center" bgcolor="#ffcccc"
| 76
| April 3, 1985
| Chicago
| L 91–100
|
|
|
| Capital Centre
| 37–39
|- align="center" bgcolor="#ffcccc"
| 77
| April 5, 1985
| @ Boston
| L 104–115
|
|
|
| Boston Garden
| 37–40
|- align="center" bgcolor="#ccffcc"
| 78
| April 6, 1985
| Cleveland
| W 109–101
|
|
|
| Capital Centre
| 38–40
|- align="center" bgcolor="#ccffcc"
| 79
| April 9, 1985
| Atlanta
| W 130–110
|
|
|
| Capital Centre
| 39–40
|- align="center" bgcolor="#ffcccc"
| 80
| April 10, 1985
| @ Milwaukee
| L 97–106
|
|
|
| MECCA Arena
| 39–41
|- align="center" bgcolor="#ffcccc"
| 81
| April 12, 1985
| @ Detroit
| L 105–115
|
|
|
| Joe Louis Arena
| 39–42
|- align="center" bgcolor="#ccffcc"
| 82
| April 13, 1985
| Philadelphia
| W 118–106
|
|
|
| Capital Centre
| 40–42

Playoffs

|- align="center" bgcolor="#ffcccc"
| 1
| April 17, 1985
| @ Philadelphia
| L 97–104
| Robinson (24)
| Ruland (10)
| Williams (8)
| The Spectrum7,170
| 0–1
|- align="center" bgcolor="#ffcccc"
| 2
| April 21, 1985
| @ Philadelphia
| L 94–113
| Malone (30)
| Robinson (11)
| Daye (9)
| The Spectrum9,612
| 0–2
|- align="center" bgcolor="#ccffcc"
| 3
| April 24, 1985
| Philadelphia
| W 118–100
| Williams (28)
| Ballard, Robinson, Ruland (7)
| Johnson, Ruland (5)
| Capital Centre11,103
| 1–2
|- align="center" bgcolor="#ffcccc"
| 4
| April 26, 1985
| Philadelphia
| L 98–106
| Malone (24)
| Ruland (10)
| Ruland (7)
| Capital Centre12,238
| 1–3
|-

Player statistics

Season

Playoffs

Awards and records

Transactions

References

See also
 1984–85 NBA season

Washington Wizards seasons
Wash
Washing
Washing